Nahavis (also Romanized as Nahāvīs and Nahawis; also known as Nabawais and Nakhavais) is a village in Sojas Rud Rural District, Sojas Rud District, Khodabandeh County, Zanjan Province, Iran. At the 2006 census, its population was 390, in 103 families.

References 

Populated places in Khodabandeh County